Raymond "Ray" Farrell is a former Northern Irish professional darts player.

Career
Farrell reached the final of the 1985 Winmau World Masters, having beaten Bobby George, Jan Erik Paulsen, Steve Gittins and Tony Payne along the way before he was eventually beaten by Dave Whitcombe. Farrell then played in three successive World Championships, losing in the first round in each occasion.  In 1987, he lost 3-2 to Alan Evans, in 1988 he lost 3-2 to Eric Bristow and in 1989 he was beaten 3-1 by Peter Evison. Farrell represented Team Northern Ireland in 1978, 1984 and 1985 with the players Steve Brennan, David Keery & Fred McMullan on the World Darts Federation. Farrell reached the final of the 1987 Nations Cup his team with Mitchell Crooks & Harold Sweeney and who losing to 10–1 over England with Bob Anderson, Eric Bristow & John Lowe.

Farrell Quit the BDO in 1993.

In 2003, Farrell began playing for the Professional Darts Corporation in Irish based events. In 2006 however, Farrell became a member of the PDPA and began playing on the pro tour.  He came close to qualifying for the 2009 PDC World Darts Championship, falling at the final hurdle to Mark Stephenson.  He also came close to qualifying for the 2009 World Grand Prix in Ireland, where having taken one of the four Irish qualifying spots ahead of the Players Championship in Austria, Farrell missed out on a countback following Jacko Barry's run into the last 32 stage in the first Players Championship who took the fourth spot ahead of Farrell who reached the last 64 stage in both tournaments.

Farrell Quit the PDC in 2010.

Farrell appeared in the seventh series of the UK television show Bullseye, attaining the highest score of the series in the show's Bronze Bully challenge.

World Championship Results

BDO
 1987: Last 32: (lost to Alan Evans 2–3)
 1988: Last 32: (lost to Eric Bristow 2–3)
 1989: Last 32: (lost to Peter Evison 1–3)

References

External links
Profile and stats on Darts Database

Darts players from Northern Ireland
Living people
British Darts Organisation players
Professional Darts Corporation former pro tour players
1957 births
Sportspeople from Derry (city)